L'Escorte is a Lucky Luke adventure written by Goscinny and illustrated by Morris. It is the twenty eighth book in the series and It was originally published in French in 1966. It was published in English in 2009 by Cinebook under the title The Escort.

Plot
Four years after the great clash between Lucky Luke and Billy the Kid resulting in a 1,247 year prison sentence for Billy, Luke is asked to escort Billy to New Mexico to face trial for the crimes he committed there. However, Billy's enduring reputation and his repeated attempts at escape - mostly with the inept assistance of felon Bert Malloy - offer Luke and Jolly Jumper their fair share of excitement on the way.

Characters 

 Billy the Kid: One of the most fearsome bandits in the west, despite his childish attitudes.
 Bert Malloy: Bandit met in prison by Billy, who will ally with him, for a share of Billy's (non-existent) 'stash'.

External links
 Lucky Luke official site album index 
 Goscinny website on Lucky Luke

References 

Comics by Morris (cartoonist)
Lucky Luke albums
1966 graphic novels
Works by René Goscinny
Comics about Billy the Kid
New Mexico in fiction